Stone Cold is a 2005 American made-for-television crime drama film directed by Robert Harmon and starring Tom Selleck, Jane Adams and Reg Rogers. Based on the 2003 novel Stone Cold by Robert B. Parker, the film is about the police chief of a small New England town who investigates a series of murders that occur with the same modus operandi. Filmed on location in Nova Scotia, the story is set in the fictitious town of Paradise, Massachusetts. 

Stone Cold is the first in a series of nine television films based on Parker's Jesse Stone novels. The film first aired on the CBS television network February 20, 2005. Even though it was broadcast first in the series of films, it actually takes place after the second film of the series, Jesse Stone: Night Passage, which aired a year after this.

Plot
Jesse Stone (Tom Selleck) is the police chief of Paradise, Massachusetts, a small coastal town north of Boston. A former homicide detective in Los Angeles, Jesse was fired from the LAPD because of a drinking problem that began following his divorce. He was hired for the Paradise position by the corrupt president of the town council who thought he would be easy to control. After five years, Jesse is still in contact with his ex-wife Jenn, who calls him regularly. He also has a relationship with a beautiful lawyer named Abby Taylor (Polly Shannon), who sits on the town council. Although their relationship is mainly physical, they have a genuine affection and concern for each other.

One cold November night, a body is discovered on a rocky shoreline by Jesse's deputy, Officer Luther "Suitcase" Simpson (Kohl Sudduth). The victim was shot twice in the heart with a .22 caliber weapon. With no suspect, motive, or weapon, Jesse begins his investigation by gathering the names of gun owners in Paradise who have registered a .22. He also adopts the victim's loyal dog, Reggie. Soon a second victim is discovered in a parking lot—also shot twice in the heart by a .22. Jesse orders photographs taken of all the vehicles in the lot and their license plates, suspecting that the killer or killers are still in the area. Following a third killing with the same modus operandi, an eyewitness comes forward who saw a red Ford Explorer driving away from the scene of the crime. Jesse checks the photos from the parking lot of the second murder and discovers the red Ford Explorer is registered to someone who is also on the list of .22 caliber gun owners in Paradise, a man named Andrew Lincoln.

Brianna and Andrew Lincoln are middle-aged thrill killers, independently wealthy from a patent Andrew obtained for an optical scanner he invented while practicing medicine. The couple moved to Paradise and began selecting random people and murdering them while videotaping their crimes. Later they find erotic pleasure in watching the videos of the murders while having sex. Jesse and Luther pay the Lincolns a visit and briefly interview the couple, who show interest in the murders. As they leave, Jesse tells Luther that the Lincolns are the killers.

Meanwhile, Jesse investigates the rape of a high school girl, Candace Pennington (Alexis Dziena), who refuses to talk about the incident and whose parents refuse to report the crime, to avoid scandal. Assisted by Officer Molly Crane (Viola Davis), Jesse discovers the identity of the three boys who raped Candace. After one of the rapists, Bo Marino (Shawn Roberts), is brought in on drug charges, Jesse discovers photos in the boy's possession of the naked Candace being raped. Bo's father and his attorney arrive at the police station, but the boy spends one night in jail. After Candace agrees to testify against the boys, Bo and his father storm into Jesse's office and force a confrontation, that ends with Candace's father knocking both Bo and his father to the floor. The attorneys for the three rapists agree to have their clients plead guilty, in exchange for sentences of "community service".

While Jesse struggles to find evidence on the Lincolns, the murderous couple begin to stalk Abby Taylor. One afternoon, while walking through a park trying to reach Jesse on her mobile phone, Abby is murdered by the Lincolns in cold blood. Devastated by his girlfriend's murder, Jesse devises a plan that will encourage the killers to attempt to kill him. He goes to the Lincolns' home and returns the .22 rifle. As they taunt the police chief with subtle talk of the murders, Jesse makes it clear that he knows they are the killers.

Jesse calls Andrew Lincoln and asks to meet later that night at the parking lot scene of the second crime and Andrew agrees. Jesse suspects that the Lincolns have other plans and while Molly and Luther wait at the parking lot, Jesse waits outside Candace's house, knowing the killers intend to kill Candace. The Lincolns show up at Candace's house and enter the living room where a tape recording of Candace and her parents is playing. Just as they realize they've been set up, Jesse enters the room. Brianna pulls out two .22 caliber pistols and shoots Jesse in the chest. Knowing of their ritualistic technique of shooting their victims in the heart, Jesse has come prepared with a bulletproof vest. Jesse returns fire and shoots Brianna dead. He turns to Andrew and tempts him to pick up his gun, but the cowering Andrew refuses, claiming he never murdered anyone only helped and saying no court will give him the death penalty and that he will outlive the police chief. Jesse responds by punching him in the face.

Afterward, Jesse returns to his house by the water and pours himself a drink. His wife calls and begins to leave a message on the answering machine, but Jesse doesn't pick up the phone. Instead he walks outside and watches the tide beneath the evening sky. He also decides to keep the dog, 'Reggie'.

Cast

Production

Filming locations
 Blue Rocks, Nova Scotia, Canada
 Halifax, Nova Scotia, Canada 
 Lunenburg, Nova Scotia, Canada

Adaptation

Robert B. Parker's Stone Cold is the fourth novel in his Jesse Stone series, but it is the first in the series to be adapted into a film, and contains significant differences. In the film, Jesse's relationship with Jenn is still relegated to phone calls, they do not reconcile at the end and Jesse does not stop drinking; in the novel, they get together and reconcile and Jesse stops drinking. In the film, Jesse sees Abby exclusively prior to her murder; in the novel, their relationship is not exclusive. In the film, Jesse sets up the Lincolns at Candace's house; in the novel, the final shootout takes place in a mall. Finally, in the film, Officer D'Angelo is not murdered.

Rating
As of now, Stone Cold is the only film in the Jesse Stone series to receive a rating by the MPAA.
It was given an R rating for "violent content, some sexuality, nudity, and brief drug use".

Reception

Critical reception
In his review for DVD Talk, Preston Jones wrote:

References
 Citations

 Bibliography

External links
 
 
 

2005 television films
2005 films
2005 crime drama films
American crime drama films
American police detective films
Crime television films
Films based on crime novels
Films set in Massachusetts
Films shot in Nova Scotia
Murder in television
CBS network films
Films directed by Robert Harmon
Films scored by Jeff Beal
Films with screenplays by John Fasano
American drama television films
2000s English-language films
2000s American films